Ivana Renić (born 21 August 1996) is a Croatian racewalker. She competed in the women's 50 kilometres walk at the 2019 World Athletics Championships held in Doha, Qatar. She did not finish her race.

In 2018, she finished in 12th place in the women's 50 kilometres walk at the European Athletics Championships held in Berlin, Germany.

References

External links 
 

Living people
1996 births
Place of birth missing (living people)
Croatian female racewalkers
World Athletics Championships athletes for Croatia
20th-century Croatian women
21st-century Croatian women